Zaandam is the main railway station of Zaandam, near Amsterdam, Netherlands. It is at the junction of the Den Helder–Amsterdam railway and the Zaandam–Enkhuizen railway.

History
Zaandam's first station debuted on November 1, 1869. This station belonged to the SS Hoogezand category. This structure had a sizable middle section that included a ticket office and access to the platforms. The two lower parts of the structure were located at this middle section. There was a large clock on the facade, and a separate building stood next to the station.

In 1983 the Hemtunnel opened, this closing the Hembrug. The station was completely rebuilt, with the distinctive red roof.  The station has 2 island platforms at ground level. In 1996 a south entrance was also opened.  There were also a few small shops and a tunnel to a shopping centre in the town centre.

In 2007 the shops and tunnel were demolished. The restaurant closed, however the florist remains open.

At the end of 2007 a Kiosk shop was opened, where snacks and hot drinks can be purchased. In 2008 the station received a ticket hall for national and international tickets.

The bus station also closed in 2007, and moved about 500m west of the main entrance, however town services 9 and 10 still stop at a platform outside the station. A new City Hall is currently being built on the former bus station, and a new bus station is now open outside the station.

In December 2008, plans for opening an 'AH to Go' were terminated.

Station is being completely renovated since April 2018.  The renovation is expected to be completed in the end of 2019.

Train services
The following train services call at Zaandam:
2x per hour intercity service Schagen - Amsterdam - Utrecht - Eindhoven - Maastricht
2x per hour intercity service Den Helder - Amsterdam - Utrecht - Nijmegen
2x per hour local service (sprinter) Hoofddorp - Schiphol Airport - Zaandam - Hoorn Kersenboogerd
2x per hour local service (sprinter) Uitgeest - Zaandam - Amsterdam - Woerden - Rotterdam (all day, every day)
2x per hour local service (sprinter) Uitgeest - Zaandam - Amsterdam - Utrecht - Rhenen (only on weekdays until 8:00PM)

Bus services

References

External links

Railway stations in North Holland
Railway stations opened in 1869
Railway stations on the Staatslijn K
1869 establishments in the Netherlands
Zaandam
Railway stations in the Netherlands opened in the 19th century